Lactotriaosylceramide beta-1,4-galactosyltransferase (beta4Gal-T4, UDP-galactose:N-acetyl-beta-D-glucosaminyl-(1->3)-beta-D-galactosyl-(1->4)-beta-D-glucosyl-(1<->1)-ceramide beta-1,4-galactosyltransferase) is an enzyme with systematic name UDP-alpha-D-galactose:N-acetyl-beta-D-glucosaminyl-(1->3)-beta-D-galactosyl-(1->4)-beta-D-glucosyl-(1<->1)-ceramide 4-beta-D-galactosyltransferase. This enzyme catalyses the following chemical reaction

 UDP-alpha-D-galactose + N-acetyl-beta-D-glucosaminyl-(1->3)-beta-D-galactosyl-(1->4)-beta-D-glucosyl-(1<->1)-ceramide  UDP + beta-D-galactosyl-(1->4)-N-acetyl-beta-D-galactosaminyl-(1->3)-beta-D-galactosyl-(1->4)-beta-D-glucosyl-(1<->1)-ceramide

References

External links 

EC 2.4.1